Nikola Jovanović may refer to:

Sports

Basketball 
 Nikola Jovanović (basketball, born 1969), Borac Čačak, Crvena zvezda, FMP Železnik, Hemofarm
 Nikola Jovanović (basketball, born 1981), played professional basketball in Serbia, Cyprus, Greece, Poland, Romania, Hungary, and France
 Nikola Jovanović (basketball, born 1994), USC, Grand Rapids Drive, Crvena zvezda, Igokea

Football 
 Nikola Jovanović (footballer, born 1952), Red Star Belgrade, Manchester United, Budućnost Podgorica
 Nikola Jovanović (footballer, born 1992), Serbian football defender

Other sports 
 Nikola Jovanović (taekwondo) (born 1990), Serbian taekwondo athlete